The 5th European Cross Country Championships were held at Ferrara in Italy on 13 December 1998. Serhiy Lebid took the title in the men's competition and Paula Radcliffe won the women's race.

Results

Men individual 9.7 km

79 runners finished

Men teams

Total 13 teams

Women individual 5.6 km

60 runners finished

Women teams

Total 12 teams

Junior men individual 5.6 km

Junior men teams

Junior women individual 3.6 km

Junior women teams

References

External links 
 Database containing all results between 1994–2007

European Cross Country Championships
European Cross Country Championships
1998 in Italian sport
International athletics competitions hosted by Italy
Cross country running in Italy
December 1998 sports events in Europe